Nett Lake, Minnesota may refer to the following places in Minnesota:
Nett Lake, Koochiching County, Minnesota, an unorganized territory
Nett Lake, St. Louis County, Minnesota, an unorganized territory
Nett Lake (CDP), Minnesota
It is part of the Bois Forte Indian Reservation